Herbert Parker (March 2, 1856 – February 11, 1939), of Lancaster, Massachusetts, was a Massachusetts politician.

Early life
Parker was born in Charlestown (now part of Boston), Suffolk County, Massachusetts on March 2, 1856. He was a son of George A. Parker and Harriet Newell ( Felton) Parker (1822–1914). His brother, Harold Parker, was one of the first highway commissioners in Massachusetts and planned many of the highways in the state.

His maternal grandparents were Anna ( Morse) Felton and Cornelius Conway Felton Sr. Among his maternal family were uncles, Cornelius Conway Felton (the President of Harvard from 1860 to 1862), Samuel Morse Felton, Sr., John B. Felton, and his cousin was Samuel Morse Felton, Jr.

He graduated from Harvard College in 1878.

Career
Parker was a Republican. He was a lawyer and served as Attorney General of Massachusetts from 1902 to 1906. He was a Unitarian.

Personal life
Parker was married to Mary Carney Vose, a daughter of Caroline Cushing ( Forbes) Vose and Lt. Josiah Hayden Vose Jr., who was killed at the Battle of Port Hudson in the U.S. Civil War. Together, they were the parents of:

 George Alanson Parker (1887–1966), who married Anne Holden (1896–1958), a daughter of Charles W. Holden.
 Katherine Vose Parker (1888–1983), a member of the Massachusetts House of Representatives.
 Edith Parker (1893–1968), who married Thorvald Salicath Ross (1887–1965).
 Haven Parker, who became Assistant Federal District Attorney General of Massachusetts and a judge.

Parker died on February 11, 1939, at his home in Lancaster, Massachusetts.

References

External links

1856 births
1939 deaths
American Unitarians
Massachusetts Attorneys General
Massachusetts lawyers
Massachusetts Republicans
People from Lancaster, Massachusetts
Harvard College alumni